Preakness may refer to:

 The Preakness or Preakness Stakes, an American flat thoroughbred horse race held in Baltimore, Maryland
 Preakness (horse), an American thoroughbred racehorse from Preakness Stables
 Preakness, New Jersey, a section of Wayne in Passaic County, New Jersey
 Preakness Range, a range of the Watchung Mountains in northern New Jersey
 Preakness Stud, a former thoroughbred horse racing breeding farm and racing stable in Preakness, New Jersey

See also